Providence Township is one of the eleven townships of Lucas County, Ohio, United States. The 2010 census found 3,361 people in the township.

Geography
Located in the far southern part of the county along the Maumee River, it borders the following townships:
Swanton Township - north
Waterville Township - northeast
Washington Township, Wood County - southeast
Grand Rapids Township, Wood County - south
Damascus Township, Henry County - southwest corner
Washington Township, Henry County - west
Swan Creek Township, Fulton County - northwest

No municipalities are located in Providence Township, although the unincorporated communities of Neapolis and Providence lie in the township's northwest and south respectively.

Name and history
Providence Township was organized in 1836. It is the only Providence Township statewide.

Government
The township is governed by a three-member board of trustees, who are elected in November of odd-numbered years to a four-year term beginning on the following January 1. Two are elected in the year after the presidential election and one is elected in the year before it. There is also an elected township fiscal officer, who serves a four-year term beginning on April 1 of the year after the election, which is held in November of the year before the presidential election. Vacancies in the fiscal officership or on the board of trustees are filled by the remaining trustees.

References

External links
Township website
County website

Townships in Lucas County, Ohio
Townships in Ohio